Erich Correns may refer to:
 Erich Correns (artist)
 Erich Correns (chemist)